Ball Nurses' Sunken Garden and Convalescent Park is a historic park and garden located on the campus of IU Health University Hospital at Indianapolis, Indiana, United States. It was designed between 1929 and 1934 by Percival Gallagher, principal landscape architect for the Olmsted Brothers. The Ball Nurses' Sunken Garden and Convalescent Park were constructed between 1930 and 1940.

It was listed on the National Register of Historic Places in 1996.

References

Buildings and structures completed in 1940
Parks in Indianapolis
National Register of Historic Places in Indianapolis
Parks on the National Register of Historic Places in Indiana
Gardens in Indiana